Lar Phar Dee (born 9 May 1995), also known as Dee Dee (ဒီးဒီး), is a Burmese blogger, motivational speaker and actor. He is best known for his speeches on motivation, mental health and the environment. He won the 2017 "Myanmar Influencer Award" for Influencer of the Year (Fan's Favourite). He was also in nomination for Myanmar's Pride Awards 2019 in the category of Best in Trend.

Early life and education
Dee Dee was born on 9 May 1995 in Tanai in the Kachin State of northernmost part of Myanmar. He is an ethnic Lisu. He graduated with a diploma in construction engineering from BCA Academy in Singapore in 2014 and continued his studies in engineering, completing a bachelor's degree in civil engineering at the University of Wollongong (UOW) in Australia in 2016.

Career
Dee Dee started blogging in 2016 with the Facebook Page Dee Dee Burmese Vlog. He was one of Myanmar's first bloggers and crowned favourite influencer in the country in 2017. He was featured in an article by UOW Outlook Magazine, portrayed as a young content creator from Myanmar. His works won him the 2017 Myanmar Influencer Award for Influencer of the Year (Fan's Favourite) category. Rising to fame in 2019, he became an actor. He made his acting debut with a leading role in mystery film Mya Mya which was based on the ture story of Mya Mya, a girl who was raped and murdered, alongside Min Taw Win, Thinzar Wint Kyaw and Khin Htwe Su Hlaing. The film was premiered in Myanmar cinemas on 6 February 2020 and became one of highest-grossing films in Myanmar. In 2019, Dee was invited to participate in TechCamp Mongolia: "Countering Disinformation with Collective Innovation". In March 2019, he took part in an open forum organised by the United States Embassy in Myanmar on the drug use epidemic affecting communities across Myanmar. He was nominated for the Myanmar Pride Awards 2019 for Best in Trend, making his audience think and inspire positivity among the youth. In 2021, he currently working with a nonprofit organization in Bangkok to promote Pre-exposure prophylaxis (PrEP).

Filmography

Film (Cinema)
 Mya Mya (မြမြ) (2020)

References

External links

Myanmar Influencer of the Year Awards (2017)

Living people
1995 births
Burmese bloggers
People from Kachin State